The Chavanon (also called la Ramade) is a  long river in the Creuse, Puy-de-Dôme, and Corrèze départements, central France. Its source is in Crocq. It flows generally southeast. It is a right tributary of the Dordogne into which it flows between Savennes and Confolent-Port-Dieu.

On most of its course, it forms part of the boundary between the Limousin and Auvergne regions.

Départements and communes along its course
This list is ordered from source to mouth: 
Creuse: Crocq, Basville, Flayat 
Puy-de-Dôme: Fernoël, Giat, 
Creuse: Saint-Merd-la-Breuille, 
Puy-de-Dôme: Verneugheol, 
Corrèze: Laroche-près-Feyt, 
Puy-de-Dôme: Saint-Germain-près-Herment, Bourg-Lastic, 
Corrèze: Feyt, Monestier-Merlines, 
Puy-de-Dôme: Messeix, 
Corrèze: Merlines, 
Puy-de-Dôme: Savennes, 
Corrèze: Saint-Étienne-aux-Clos, Confolent-Port-Dieu,

References

Rivers of France
Rivers of Corrèze
Rivers of Creuse
Rivers of Puy-de-Dôme
Rivers of Auvergne-Rhône-Alpes
Rivers of Nouvelle-Aquitaine